The Eastwood Academy (formerly The Eastwood School) is a secondary school in Leigh-on-Sea, Essex.

Notable pupils
Celtic footballer Cameron Carter-Vickers is a former pupil of the school.

References

External links
The Eastwood Academy official website

Academies in Southend-on-Sea
Secondary schools in Southend-on-Sea